Rudi Kapeli (born 27 August 1957) is a Tongan rugby union player. He made his international debut in 1992 against  and made his last appearance against  in 1993. He injured n halfback Peter Slattery in the match when he dropped onto him with his knees. He captained Marist in 1989. Kapeli also coached Marist.

References

External links
ESPN Scrum Profile

Living people
1957 births
Tongan rugby union players
Rugby union hookers
Auckland rugby union players
Tonga international rugby union players